Sia Airfield, also known as Kiriwina North Drome, was an airfield built on the northern end of Kiriwina Island during the Second World War. It was built by the No. 6 Airfield Construction Squadron RAAF in August 1943 but mainly used by the United States Army Air Forces. The airfield ran roughly northwest to southeast with a taxiway and revetments on each side of the airfield.

References

World War II airfields in Papua New Guinea
Defunct airports in Papua New Guinea
Milne Bay Province
1940s establishments in Papua New Guinea